Crocodile Love Story  is a 2013 Indian Malayalam-language romantic comedy film directed by Anoop Ramesh and produced by Anurag Motion Pictures. It features Praveen Prem and Avanthika Mohan in the lead roles. The music and background score is composed by Arun Sidharrth. The movie, which used the technique of Animatronics for the first time in Malayalam cinema released on 19 July 2013.

Plot
Kiran, son of retired Government staff Parameswaran is working in a hardware firm after completing his B.Tech course, with no responsibilities and aims in his life. Nithya, only daughter of bank manager Narayanan Namboothiri and Gayathri is working in a private IT firm after completing her M.Tech. These two childhood friends meet each other and eventually fall in love. But the parents of both their families are against the love between them, being very conventional. They elope to a distant remote place near to a forest. There a crocodile enters between them, and thus crocodile love story begins. The interesting incidents and unexpected twists happening after crocodile's entry forms the rest of the story.

Cast
 Praveen Prem as Kiran
 Avanthika Mohan as Nithya Namboothiri
 Kalabhavan Mani as S.I Suresh
 Prem Kumar as S.I.Vishwambharan
 Manikuttan as Sreeraj
 Ashokan as Narayanan Nampoothiri
 R. K. Thayyil as Parameswaran
 Dinesh Panicker as S.P Anthony
 Maya Viswanath as Gayathri, Nithya's mother
 Vijayan Karanthoor as Sreeraj's uncle
 Praseetha Menon as Sreeraj's mother
 Santhosh Kurup as Sreeraj's father

Production
The pooja of the film was held in Thiruvananthapuram on 2 January 2013, which was attended by many special guests such as director Shyamaprasad, director Shaji Kailas, producer Suresh Babu of Revathi Kalamandir, his wife and old Malayalam actress Menaka, Thiruvananthapuram Corporation mayor Adv. J. Chandrika and also by most of the cast and crew of the film. The first schedule which also included the shooting of one song started on 9 January 2013 at Thiruvananthapuram with Corporation Mayor Adv. J. Chandrika, mother of director Anoop Ramesh switching on the camera and completed in various places of Thiruvananthapuram within 24 days. The second schedule shooting was done at Malampuzha dams in Palakkad in March with a duration of around 18 days, mainly shooting the scenes of crocodile. The editing and dubbing works have been completed in Thiruvananthapuram and Chennai.

Soundtrack
The music and background score for the movie is composed by Arun Sidharrth, while Sreeprasad C penned the lyrics. Audio and video of the song has been released on 5 July 2013.

Critical reception
Crocodile Love story getting mixed reviews from critics.

tikkview.com gives 2.8/5 for this movie. They have given good ratings for visual graphics, music and cinematography.

References 

 Film pooja of 'Crocodile Love Story'. Istream. Retrieved on 1 April 2013.
 Crocodile Love Story image gallery. Indiglamour. Retrieved on 1 April 2013.
 Animatronic crocodile in a mollywood film. Chennaipatrika. Retrieved on 1 April 2013.
 Crocodile Love Story started rolling. Nowrunning. Retrieved on 1 April 2013.
 Crocodile Love Story Praveen-Avanthika. Indianterminal. Retrieved on 1 April 2013.
 Praveen Prem to play the lead in a romantic comedy. Chennaipatrika. Retrieved on 1 April 2013.
 Praveen Prem to play the lead in a rom-com. Times of India. Retrieved on 1 April 2013.
 Crocodile Love Story - First malayalam film to use animatronics technology. Entecity. Retrieved on 1 April 2013.
 Crocodile Love Story - Pooja. KeralaBoxOffice. Retrieved on 1 April 2013.
 Mayor Chandrika's son Anoop Ramesh's Crocodile Love Story in the making. MetroMatinee. Retrieved on 1 April 2013.
 A Crocodile Love Story. TheaterBalcony. Retrieved on 1 April 2013.
 Crocodile Love Story. FilmiParadise. Retrieved on 1 April 2013.
 Smitten by love. The Hindu. Retrieved on 1 April 2013.
 An upbeat launch. Times of India. Retrieved on 1 April 2013.

External links 
 

2013 films
Indian romantic comedy films
2010s Malayalam-language films
2013 romantic comedy films
Films about crocodilians